Dennis King (born November 1, 1971) is the 33rd and current premier of Prince Edward Island since 2019 and current leader of the Progressive Conservative Party of Prince Edward Island.

Early life

Born in Georgetown, Prince Edward Island, King worked in many Prince Edward Island media outlets for years, including the Eastern Graphic, The Guardian and CFCY-FM. In 1997 he started work as a public relations coordinator for the Ministry of Transportation, then became director of communications for the Department of Development and Technology, and finally director of communications and executive assistant to the 30th premier of Prince Edward Island, Pat Binns.

Political career

On February 9, 2019, King was elected leader of the Progressive Conservative Party of Prince Edward Island, at the party's leadership convention in Charlottetown. King led his party to win a plurality of seats in the Legislative Assembly of Prince Edward Island following the 2019 Prince Edward Island general election and won his seat in the district of Brackley-Hunter River. His party acquired 12 seats overall.

Premier of Prince Edward Island (2019–present)

On April 30, 2019, King was invited by Lieutenant-Governor Antoinette Perry to form a minority government and was sworn in as premier on May 9, 2019. With a victory in a November 2020 by-election, the PCs became a majority government.

Personal life

King is the author of two books: The Day They Shot Reveen: Stories from a PEI Small Town (2016) and The Legend of Bubby Stevens (2017). He has been married to Jana Hemphill since 1999, and together they have three children.

References

Living people
Year of birth missing (living people)
Place of birth missing (living people)
Progressive Conservative Party of Prince Edward Island MLAs
Progressive Conservative Party of Prince Edward Island leaders
1970s births
People from Kings County, Prince Edward Island